Mhaismal, is a hill station located in the Aurangabad District of Maharashtra in India. 

Mhaismal is situated at an altitude of 1067 meters, is about 12 kilometers from Khuldabad and is about 40 Kilometers from Aurangabad City. On the way there are Ellora Caves, Grishneshwar Temple and Devgiri Fort.

Mhaismal attracts visitors during monsoons when it is covered in greenery.

References

http://www.amazingmaharashtra.com/2013/01/mhaismal.html
http://www.aurangabaddirectory.com/mhaismal.html

Hill stations in Maharashtra
Tourist attractions in Aurangabad, Maharashtra